The sedge sprite (Nehalennia irene) is a species of damselfly in the family Coenagrionidae.

Identification 
On male sedge sprites, the thorax is bright green above and black above blue or yellow-green on the sides. His abdomen is dark iridescent green and has a blue tip with dark green spots. His large eyes are black above blue with a thin blue bar across the top of the head. On female sedge sprites, the back of the thorax is dark green and the sides are yellowish. Her abdomen is dark above and yellowish below. Her large eyes are greenish or yellowish.

Diet 
The sedge sprite feeds on insects. This damselfly flight pattern is low, in and out of vegetation away from open water.

Size 
The sedge sprite is a rather small damselfly in size. It has an average length of 1-1.5 inches (25-38 millimeters).

Habitat 
The sedge sprite is usually found along vernal pools, marshes and grassy ponds.

Distribution 
United States: (Alaska • California • Connecticut • District Of Columbia • Delaware • Iowa • Idaho • Illinois • Indiana • Kentucky • Massachusetts • Maryland • Maine • Michigan • Minnesota • Montana • Nebraska • North Dakota • New Hampshire • New Jersey • Ohio • Oregon • Pennsylvania • Rhode Island • South Carolina • Utah • Vermont • Washington • Wisconsin • West Virginia • Wyoming)
Canada: (Alberta • British Columbia • Manitoba • New Brunswick • Newfoundland and Labrador • Northwest Territories • Nova Scotia • Nunavut • Ontario • Prince Edward Island • Quebec • Saskatchewan)

Flight season 
The sedge sprite is most active through mid May to early September.

Habits 
This species of damselfly has relatively narrow wings that are held above the abdomen when at rest. It will perch on many emergent plants.

Similar species 
Sedge sprites are similar to sphagnum sprites and southern sprites.

References 
NHL Sedge Sprite
Nehalennia irene, Sedge Sprite, Family Coenagrionidae
Sedge Sprite - Nehalennia irene
Nehalennia irene (Sedge Sprite)

Coenagrionidae
Odonata of North America
Insects described in 1861